Cemal Oğuz (born 1 December 1980) is a Turkish judoka.

Achievements

References

1980 births
Living people
Turkish male judoka
Place of birth missing (living people)
21st-century Turkish people